The Countess of Monte Cristo is a 1932 German comedy drama film directed by Karl Hartl and starring Brigitte Helm, Rudolf Forster and Lucie Englisch.

The film's sets were designed by the art directors Robert Herlth and Walter Röhrig. It was shot at the Babelsberg Studios outside Berlin and on location in Vienna and the ski resort of Semmering. It was remade in the United States in 1934 with Fay Wray in the lead role.

Plot
Two struggling actresses are hired as extras to drive an expensive car while dressed in fancy outfits. Stopping at a winter resort they decide to pass themselves off as part of the wealthy set, one of them declaring herself to be the "Countess of Monte Cristo".

Cast
Brigitte Helm as Jeanette Heider, Filmkomparsin
Rudolf Forster as Rumowski, Impostor
Lucie Englisch as Mimi, Filmkomparsin
Gustaf Gründgens as Der 'Baron' Impostor
Oskar Sima as Aufnahmeleiter Spitzkopf
Mathias Wieman as Stephan Riehl, Journalist
Flockina von Platen as Filmdiva
Ernst Dumcke as film director
Hans Junkermann as Hoteldirektor
Theo Lingen as Etagenkellner
Max Gülstorff as newspaper editor
Karl Etlinger as newspaper editor
Harry Hardt as Detective Commissioner

See also
The Countess of Monte Cristo (1934)
The Countess of Monte Cristo (1948)
Just Once a Great Lady (1957)

References

External links

1930s romantic comedy-drama films
Films of the Weimar Republic
German romantic comedy-drama films
Films directed by Karl Hartl
Films about con artists
Films about filmmaking
UFA GmbH films
Films shot in Austria
Films shot at Babelsberg Studios
Films set in Vienna
German black-and-white films
1932 comedy films
1932 drama films
1930s German films
1930s German-language films